Perus is a train station on CPTM Line 7-Ruby, in the district of Perus in São Paulo.

History
Perus station was opened by São Paulo Railway on 16 February 1867 and, since 1994, is operated by CPTM. Along with Piqueri, Pirituba, Vila Clarice, Jaraguá and Vila Aurora stations, it's also located in North Side São Paulo.

Accidents

1969 accident between Caieiras and Perus
In the morning of 21 March 1969, a train that departe from Francisco Morato station stopped between Caieiras and Perus because of an electrical failure in the train. The train drive and the chief of the composition request a diesel powered locomotive with a maintenance team to tow the train until the nearest station, where the repair should be done.

However, the repair was done right there, in the middle of the tracks, by the railway machine inspector, Jorge Pilot, who left a train who was heading toward Jundiaí. After the repair, the train began to work again normally, until 5 minutes later, when in crashed with the maintenance locomotive which was heading in the opposite way and was initially request for the repair. In the accident, 40 people died (according to Folha de S. Paulo and Revista Veja), among them the inspector Jorge Pilot, and another 400 were wounded.

2000 accident in Perus
At 9:15pm BRT, a TUE Budd Mafersa-Series 1100, which left Jaraguá towards Francisco Morato, stopped at Perus because of power outage. The accident caused the death of 9 people and other 115 wounded and almost destroyed the entire station.

References

Companhia Paulista de Trens Metropolitanos stations
Railway stations opened in 1867